The Labour Front is a defunct political party in Singapore that operated from 1955 to 1960.

History
The Labour Front was founded to contest the 1955 legislative elections by David Saul Marshall, Singapore's first chief minister and Lim Yew Hock, Singapore's second chief minister. A centre-left grouping, the Labour Front won 10 out of 25 elected seats in the legislative council and formed the first elected government of Singapore, which at that time was a separate crown colony.
 	
Between 1955 and 1956, after sending two bi-partisan delegations to London for talks with the British, David Marshall's administration failed to gain approval from Britain for self-government in Singapore. David Marshall, taking responsibility for this failure, resigned in 1956 and soon went to form the Workers' Party of Singapore the following year. Critics believed that the British were not convinced of David Marshall's ability to govern Singapore well and to deal with the then rising threat of insurgency carried out in the name of communism. Marshall's more hardline stance in dealing with the underground Communist movement was only counterproductive. He was succeeded by Lim Yew Hock.

The Lim Yew Hock government did not fare any better. Apart from the threat of the underground communist movement, Singapore faced problems in public order, poor economy, poor housing and sanitation, low living standards and corruption in the government. The then-opposition People's Action Party (PAP), led by Lee Kuan Yew, grilled the Labour Front government several times on these issues in parliamentary sessions. Later the majority of the Labour Front led by Lim Yew Hock, left the Labour Front to merge with the Liberal Socialists (formed by the Progressive Party and Democratic Party in 1956) to form the Singapore People's Alliance (SPA) in 1959.

In 1957 and 1958, two bi-partisan delegations successfully negotiated Singapore's status to be a self-governing state.
 	
The PAP had won 43 of 51 seats in the parliament with a popular vote of 53% and had campaigned on an anti-colonial platform with an ambition to initiate several reforms, improve the economy and living standards of the people and to eradicate corruption in the government. The SPA lost power and was reduced to only a handful of seats in opposition, while the Labour Front was reduced to a very small percentage of the original party and was eventually dissolved in 1960.

General election results

Prominent Members 
 David Saul Marshall, first Chief Minister, member of the first Legislative Assembly of Singapore representing Cairnhill
 Lim Yew Hock, second Chief Minister, Minister for Labour and Welfare (1955—1959), member of the second Legislative Council of Singapore representing Keppel, member of the first Legislative Assembly of Singapore representing Havelock, member of the second Legislative Assembly of Singapore representing Cairnhill
 Francis Thomas, Minister for Communications and Works (1955 - 1959), Principal of St. Andrew's Secondary School (1963 - 1974)
 Armand Joseph Braga, Minister of Health (1955 - 1959), member of the first Legislative Assembly of Singapore representing Katong
 Chew Swee Kee, Minister of Education (1955 - 1959), member of the first Legislative Assembly of Singapore representing Whampoa
 Jumabhoy Mohamed Jumabhoy, Minister for Commerce and Industry (1955—1959), member of the first Legislative Assembly of Singapore representing Stamford, President of the Singapore Indian Chamber of Commerce (1978 - 1992)
 Anthony Rebeiro Lazarous, member of the first Legislative Assembly of Singapore representing Farrer Park
 Mak Pak Shee, member of the first Legislative Assembly of Singapore representing Geylang
 Seah Peng Chuan, member of the first Legislative Assembly of Singapore representing Kampong Kapor
 Tan Theng Chiang, member of the first Legislative Assembly of Singapore representing Rochore 
 Lee Choon Eng, member of the first Legislative Assembly of Singapore representing Queenstown

References

 	

Labour parties
Political parties established in 1954
Political parties disestablished in 1960
Defunct political parties in Singapore
1954 establishments in Singapore
1960 disestablishments in Singapore